The Burraneer Bay is a bay on the lower estuarine Hacking River of Port Hacking in southern Sydney, in the state of New South Wales, Australia.

Location and features
With a catchment that drains many of the most southern suburbs of the Sutherland Shire, Burraneer Bay is located near where the Hacking River and Port Hacking estuary meet Gunnamatta Bay and empty into Bate Bay. The bay's catchment area is bound by Port Hacking to the south, Gunnamatta Bay sub-catchment to the east, Dolans Bay sub-catchment to the west and the Woolooware Bay sub-catchment to the north. A marina is located on the north western side of Burraneer Bay.

Notable residents that have lived in the area surrounding Burraneer Bay include cricket players Ricky Ponting and Glenn McGrath.

Burraneer is an Aboriginal word meaning "point of the bay". The bay was named by surveyor Robert Dixon in 1827, who chose many Aboriginal names for many of the bays in the area.

References

Bays of New South Wales
Marinas in Australia